Peter Martin (STP) was an Irish preacher and Master of Sacred Theology, who died 1645.

Martin was born in the town of Galway, Ireland, and by 1615 had already been a student at St. Patrick's College in Lisbon. He joined the Dominican Order and was in that year studying at Salamanca. By 1622 he had returned to Ireland where he enjoyed much success as  preacher. In 1626 he was proposed as lector primarius et moderator studiorum of a proposed Dominican school at Galway. He was prior of that community in July 1631.

In the late 1630s he was one of a number of Connacht Dominicans proposed as candidates for various offices, such as Achonry, Armagh and Clonfert. Material from the time describes him as for the past fifteen years eminent at Galway both for preaching and for his teaching of philosophy, rhetoric and letters. He died at Galway in 1645.

See also

 The Tribes of Galway

References

 History of Galway, James Hardiman, 1820
 Irish Dominicans at Lisbon before 1700: a Biographical Register, Hugh Fenning, in Collectanea Hibernica, pp. 27–65 volume 42, 2000

People from County Galway
17th-century Irish Roman Catholic priests
Irish Dominicans
Irish expatriates in Spain
Irish expatriates in Portugal